Sugar Ray Marimón (born September 30, 1988) is a Colombian former professional baseball pitcher. He has played for the Atlanta Braves of Major League Baseball (MLB) and the KT Wiz of the KBO League.

Career

Kansas City Royals
Marimón signed with Kansas City Royals' scout Mike Toomey for approximately $25,000 and played in the organization from 2007 to 2014.

Atlanta Braves
Prior to the 2015 season he signed a minor league deal with the Atlanta Braves. Marimón was invited to spring training, but did not make the opening day roster.

Marimón was called up to the majors for the first time on April 13, 2015. He debuted the next day, throwing four innings against the Miami Marlins in relief of Trevor Cahill.

KT Wiz
He signed with the KBO's KT Wiz in November 2015. He was released on July 10, 2016. Marimón represented Colombia at the 2017 World Baseball Classic.

Personal
Marimón is the second cousin of pitcher Julio Teherán. Both played for the Atlanta Braves during the 2015 MLB season.

References

External links

1988 births
Living people
Atlanta Braves players
Baseball players at the 2019 Pan American Games
Burlington Bees players
Burlington Royals players
Cardenales de Lara players
Colombian expatriate baseball players in Venezuela
Colombian expatriate baseball players in the United States
Colombian expatriates in South Korea
Dominican Summer League Royals players
Expatriate baseball players in South Korea
Gwinnett Braves players
Idaho Falls Chukars players
Kane County Cougars players
KBO League pitchers
KT Wiz players
Major League Baseball pitchers
Major League Baseball players from Colombia
Northwest Arkansas Naturals players
Omaha Storm Chasers players
Sportspeople from Cartagena, Colombia
Tigres del Licey players
Colombian expatriate baseball players in the Dominican Republic
Wilmington Blue Rocks players
2017 World Baseball Classic players
Pan American Games competitors for Colombia
Águilas Cibaeñas players